Nakovanj or Nakovana is a village located in the west of the Pelješac peninsula in southern Dalmatia, Croatia, on the inland part of the peninsula, by the road connecting Viganj and Lovište. It has a population of 3 (census 2011).

Nakovana is best known as an archeological site, as it has preserved artifacts indicating continuous human settlement over several millennia.

References

Populated places in Dubrovnik-Neretva County
Archaeological sites in Croatia